The Daily Habit is a sports telecast airing on Fuel TV hosted by Pat Parnell. The show features personalities in the world of extreme sports, including surfboarding, skateboarding, snowboarding, as well as other personalities from entertainment and popular music such as rock bands from the 1990s and today. The Daily Habit began airing on October 3, 2005. Its seventh season began airing on September 1, 2011. In October 2011, ESPN reported that the show had been cancelled. The final taping was scheduled for November 22, and the show was set to air until the end of the year.

References

External links

2005 American television series debuts
2010s American television series
American sports television series
English-language television shows